Intro – The Gift Recordings is a compilation album by Pulp. It contains the band's three singles recorded for Gift and was released in October 1993. The version of "Babies" included here is the original single mix released in 1992, slightly different from the 1994 version available on the album His 'n' Hers. "Sheffield: Sex City" features a spoken vocal contribution from keyboardist Candida Doyle - reciting a selection from the book My Secret Garden by Nancy Friday - which is one of the few times her voice is audible on a Pulp song.

Track listing
All music written by Pulp, all lyrics written by Jarvis Cocker (except where noted).

"Space" – 5:11
"O.U. (12" Mix)" – 3:43
"Babies" – 4:04
"Styloroc (Nites of Suburbia)" – 3:10
"Razzmatazz" – 3:40
"Sheffield: Sex City" – 8:31 (opening spoken passage taken from My Secret Garden by Nancy Friday)

Inside Susan – A Story in 3 Parts
"Stacks" – 2:42
"Inside Susan" – 5:34
"59 Lyndhurst Grove" – 3:33

Personnel
Jarvis Cocker – vocals, guitar
Russell Senior – guitar, violin
Candida Doyle – organ, synthesizer, stylophone, vocals
Steve Mackey – bass
Nick Banks – drums

References

External links

Intro – The Gift Recordings at YouTube (streamed copy where licensed)

Music in Sheffield
Pulp (band) albums
1993 compilation albums
Island Records compilation albums